Carl G. Fenner (July 23, 1899 – November 26, 1991) was the President of the National Association of Trees in the 1930s and the Director of the Michigan Department of Parks. The Carl G. Fenner Nature Center (formerly the Carl. G. Fenner Arboretum) in Lansing, Michigan bears his name.

External links
 Fenner Nature Center
 Friends of Fenner Nature Center
 Obituary

1899 births
1991 deaths
American botanists